Rasmus Wengberg (born 2 December 1974) is a Swedish badminton player who was the bronze medalist in the 2002 European Championships in Malmö.

Born and raised in Skåne, Wengberg played until 2005 for IFK umeå. For a few years, he played for a German team, but nowadays he plays for IFK Umeå in Sweden, working as a teacher while not pursuing his badminton career.
Now he is a teacher at Prolympia (school).

External links
 
 
 

1974 births
Living people
Swedish male badminton players
Olympic badminton players of Sweden
Badminton players at the 2000 Summer Olympics
Sportspeople from Skåne County
20th-century Swedish people